A coastal skipper is a yachtsman or woman who has the ability to skipper a yacht in coastal waters by day or night. There is a shorebased course which provides the background knowledge required, a practical course which teaches the skills and techniques required, and a Certificate of Competence.

While the qualification originated in the United Kingdom, the course is taught worldwide.
Recognised sailing Schools authorised to conduct the training can be found on the RYA website.

RYA Coastal Skipper Practical Sailing Course 
This is a course for potential skippers and those attending should already have a good knowledge of the theory of navigation and meteorology, and have a level of experience approaching that for the Coastal Skipper Certificate of Competence. The course may be taken in tidal and non-tidal versions.

Assumed knowledge 
Navigation to Coastal Skipper Shorebased standard.
Sailing to Day Skipper Practical standard.
15 days sea time (2 days as skipper) - 300 miles, 8 night hours.

Course content 
 Passage planning: Can plan a coastal passage including a consideration of the capabilities of the yacht, navigation, victualling, weather, ports of refuge, tidal heights and tidal streams, publications required and strategy. Knows customs procedures for most common circumstances.
 Preparation for sea: Aware of safety equipment required for offshore passages, and can prepare a yacht for sea including stowage, safety briefing, watch keeping, delegating responsibilities and equipment and engine checks
 Pilotage: Preparing a pilotage plan, with consideration of soundings, transits, clearing bearings, buoyage, port or harbour regulations and tidal considerations. Able to pilot a yacht by day and night.
 Organisational and skipper skills: Can take charge of a yacht and direct the crew, organise the navigation, deckwork and domestic duties of a yacht on passage, awareness of the significance of meteorological trends, aware of crew welfare and can use electronic navigational equipment for planning and undertaking a passage, including the use of waypoints and routes.
 Yacht handling under power: Able to control the yacht effectively in a confined space under power, including all berthing and unberthing situations in various conditions of wind and tide.
 Yacht handling under sail: Can use the sails to control the yacht in a confined space, and capable of anchoring and mooring in various conditions of wind and tide.  
 Adverse weather conditions: Understanding of preparations for heavy weather and yacht handling in strong winds, and navigation in restricted visibility.
 Emergency situations: Recovery of man overboard under power or sail, actions to be taken when abandoning to the liferaft and during helicopter and lifeboat rescues.

RYA/MCA Coastal Skipper Certificate of Competence 
The RYA/MCA Coastal Skipper Certificate of Competence confirms that the successful candidate 'has the knowledge needed to skipper a yacht on coastal cruises but does not necessarily have the experience needed to undertake longer passages.' The Royal Yachting Association administers the Yachtmaster scheme and examines candidates on behalf of the UK Maritime and Coastguard Agency.

Pre-requisites 
Candidates must be aged 17 or over and require:

 Radio Operators Qualification - A Restricted (VHF only) Radio Operators Certificate or a GMDSS Short Range Certificate or higher grade of marine radio certificate.
 First Aid - a valid First Aid Certificate, from the RYA. First Aid qualifications held by Police, Fire and Armed Services are also acceptable.
 Seatime - 800 miles logged within 10 years prior to examination, 30 days living on board 2 days as skipper and 12 night hours.  For holders of the Coastal Skipper Practical Course Completion Certificate, the seatime requirement is reduced to: 400 miles, 20 days living aboard, 12 night hours, 2 days as skipper.  Half the qualifying seatime must have been conducted in tidal waters.

Exam 
The exam takes about 6 to 10 hours for one candidate and 8 to 14 hours for two. Candidates are set tasks to demonstrate their ability as a Coastal Skipper and may be asked questions on any part of the syllabus for all practical and shorebased courses up to Coastal Skipper.

RYA Coastal Skipper and Yachtmaster Offshore Shorebased Course 
This course assumes that the student has already studied navigation to Day Skipper Shorebased standard. This is an advanced course in navigation and meteorology for candidates for the Coastal Skipper and Yachtmaster Offshore Certificate. The course lasts about 40 hours. It may be taken continuously over several days, or as evening or several weekends, or by distance learning.

See also
Competent Crew
Day Skipper
Yachtmaster

References

External links 
 Royal yachting Association

Sailing qualifications